The 1942–43 Michigan Wolverines men's basketball team represented the University of Michigan in intercollegiate basketball during the 1942–43 season.  The team finished the season in a tie for eight place in the Big Ten Conference with an overall record of 10–8 and 4–8 against conference opponents.

Bennie Oosterbaan was in his fifth year as the team's head coach.  James Mandler was the team's leading scorer with 160 points in 18 games for an average of 8.9 points per game. Mandler, who had set a team scoring record with 230 points during the 1941–42 season, was also the team captain. Dave Strack, who was the team's second leading scorer, served as the head coach of the Michigan men's basketball team from 1960 to 1968.  Bob Wiese, who was the team's third leading scorer, played professional football for the Detroit Lions from 1947 to 1948.

Statistical leaders

References

Michigan
Michigan Wolverines men's basketball seasons
Michigan Wolverines basketball
Michigan Wolverines basketball